BestBuys Interactive BV, doing business as BBI Films, was an independent film distributor with 600 movie titles and documentaries to his name. The company has been active in the entertainment industry since 2002 and is located in Harderwijk, the Netherlands.

Distribution 

Recent BBI movie releases.

 The Hammer
 The Last Death
 Amazing Racer
 Beyond the Trophy
 The Confession
 Battle Earth
 Flying Lessons 
 Saving Grace B. Jones
 The Shunning
 Inuk
 Bullets & Cookies
 Blood Money
 The Employer
 Missionary
 Dust of War
 Novel Romance
 Score
 Petunia

Production 
BBI Films acquires, distributes, and markets films, but also has been and is producing several movie titles. BBI Films produced Shade of Pale (2005), I.R.A.: King of Nothing (2006), Mexican Gangster (2008), The Bad Game (2009) and Love, Hate and Security (2014).

References

External links 
 Official website

Film distributors of the Netherlands
Companies based in Gelderland
Harderwijk